Kathanayakudu may refer to:
 Kathanayakudu (1969 film), Indian Telugu-language film
 Kathanayakudu (1984 film), Indian Telugu-language film
 Kathanayakudu (2008 film), Indian Telugu-language film
 NTR: Kathanayakudu, 2019 Indian Telugu-language film